McLaren v McLaren [1919] NZGazLawRp 83; (1919) 21 GLR 287 is a cited case in New Zealand regarding succession wills.

References

High Court of New Zealand cases
1919 in New Zealand law